Nicolas Warembourg (born in 1974) is a French jurist, professor of Law at the Sorbonne.

He specializes in historic, public and constitutional law.

He is regularly interviewed. He is the most highly specialized regarding Guy Coquille.

Training
He holds his PhD in Law from Lille 2 University of Health and Law.
He is a professor at the Sorbonne Law School.

Publications

Nicolas Warembourg, Guy Coquille et le droit français : Le droit commun coutumier dans la doctrine juridique du XVIè siècle, 2005, 864 p.
Nicolas Warembourg, La déposition du pape hérétique : lieux théologiques, modèles canoniques, enjeux constitutionnels, Editions Mare & Martin, 2005, Presses universitaires de Sceaux, 222 p.
Nicolas Warembourg, L'écho des lois : du parchemin à internet, La Documentation française, 2012, 157 p.
Nicolas Warembourg, Introduction historique au droit privé : Tome 1, les personnes, Presses Universitaires de France, 2019
Nicolas Warembourg, Introduction historique au droit privé : Tome 2, La responsabilité, Presses Universitaires de France, 2020
Nicolas Warembourg, Introduction historique au droit privé : Tome 3, Actions, obligations, Presses Universitaires de France, 2022

Article (selection)
Nicolas Warembourg, « Lire, voir, entendre - LEVY (Thierry) et ROYER (Jean-Pierre), Labori, un avocat pour Zola, pour Dreyfus, contre la terre entière, Paris : éditions Louis Audibert, 2006. », Les Cahiers de la justice, Dalloz, N° 1, 2008, p. 153
Collectif, Henri Lévy-Bruhl, Mare & Martin, 350 p.

References 

21st-century French lawyers
French legal scholars
Living people
1974 births
Pantheon-Sorbonne University alumni
Academic staff of Pantheon-Sorbonne University